Mohammad Javad Molaei (born October 8, 2000 in Nowshahr) is an Iranian footballer who plays as a winger for Iranian club Nassaji Mazandaran in the Persian Gulf Pro League.

Club career

Nassaji
He made his debut for Nassaji Mazandaran in 1st fixtures of 2021–22 Persian Gulf Pro League against Fajr Sepasi while he substituted in for Masoud Shojaei.

References

Living people
2000 births
Association football wingers
Iranian footballers
Esteghlal F.C. players
Tractor S.C. players
Nassaji Mazandaran players
People from Nowshahr
Sportspeople from Mazandaran province